Water for South Sudan (formerly known as Water for Sudan) is a not-for-profit US 501(c)(3) corporation founded in 2003 whose mission, according to their website, is to "deliver sustainable quality-of-life services to the people of South Sudan by efficiently providing access to clean, safe water, and improving hygiene and sanitation practices in areas of great need." The goal of Water for South Sudan is to water the seeds of change in South Sudan by drilling wells, delivering hygiene education, and providing sanitation services.

The operations team, based in Wau, South Sudan, mainly performs work in remote villages in the Bahr el-Ghazal region of South Sudan. Administrative headquarters are located in Rochester, NY.

History
In 2003, former "Lost Boy" of Sudan, Salva Dut, founded Water for South Sudan in Rochester, NY. Salva's story began in 1974 when he was born in a rural village in southwestern Sudan to a tribe of Dinka people. When Salva was 11 years old, in 1985, Sudan was wracked by the Second Sudanese Civil War. During this war, the "militia killed, plundered, burned, and raped their way through a huge swathe of Southern Sudan from 1985 to 1989". During this time, millions died and millions more were displaced, fleeing to refugee camps in Ethiopia, Kenya and other neighboring countries. When the fighting reached Salva's village, he was separated from his family and joined thousands of other children, mostly boys, famously known as the Lost Boys of Sudan who had to seek safety on foot in refugee camps in Ethiopia and Kenya.

After living in refugee camps for 10 years, Salva received an opportunity to move to the US in 1996. Several years after living in the US, Salva learned that his father was still alive in Southern Sudan but was suffering with disease caused by waterborne parasites. Hearing of his father's illness inspired Salva to help both his father and his country by bringing clean water to those in need. That was the beginning of Water for South Sudan. Salva's story is told in the New York Times bestseller A Long Walk to Water by Linda Sue Park.

Two years after the founding of WFSS, in 2005, after over two decades of war, the Comprehensive Peace Agreement was signed. This was the culmination of peace negotiations to find a comprehensive, lasting solution to the conflict that had divided north and south Sudan. After the truce was declared, the semi-autonomous Government of Southern Sudan was established for that region.

Operations

Water Wells
In 2005, the first drilling operations began. WFSS drilled five wells in Sudanese villages in the first year. Since then, over 500 wells have been drilled (as of May 2021), each serving approximately 500-1,000 people and pumping 1,800 gallons of water per day. During the drilling season from December to June each year, WFSS aims to drill 40 to 50 wells, each taking 3 to 4 days to build.

People in the villages where (WFSS) operates become partners in the process of making safe, drinkable water available there. The WFSS team trains the well manager and provides spare parts. To help with repairs, in 2017, WFSS launched its well rehabilitation program. The well rehab team returns to older wells to repair broken parts and upgrade the cement platforms around the wells.

Hygiene Education
In each village where WFSS drills a well, they also offer a 3-day hygiene education program taught by one of their two hygiene teams. Key topics include personal hygiene, safe water practices, food safety, safe disposal of waste, and women's hygiene.

See also
 A Long Walk to Water – Children's book with fictionalized version of Dut's story

References

Further reading

External links
 
 https://tedxbeaconstreet.com/speakers/salva-dut/ Salva Dut's Ted Talk

Water supply and sanitation in South Sudan
Non-profit organizations based in New York (state)
Environmental organizations based in New York (state)
Organizations established in 2003
Lost Boys of Sudan